Protein ariadne-1 homolog is a protein that in humans is encoded by the ARIH1 gene.

Interactions
ARIH1 has been shown to interact with:
 EIF4E2, and
 UBE2L3.

References

External links

Further reading